Baird is a given name which may refer to:

Baird Bryant (1927–2008), American cinematographer and filmmaker
Baird Searles (1934–1993), American science fiction author and critic
Baird T. Spalding (1872–1953), American writer
Baird Tipson, American academic and college administrator